Lampadephoria (Λαμπαδηφορία) and Lampadedromia (Λαμπαδηδρομία) was an ancient Greek type of torch race. The race was run usually on foot, but sometimes it was also on horses by ephebi (a Greek youth entering manhood). The torches were of two kinds—one a sort of candlestick and the other one of a more conventional kind. There were different methods of the race. 

The first was a Relay race. Runners (λαμπαδισταί or λαμποδηφόροι), posted at intervals, the first in each line who receives the torch, or takes it from the altar, running at his best speed and handing it to the second in his own line, and the second to the third, until the last in the line is reached, who runs with it up to the appointed spot. The winner was the first team to pass the torch over the finish line. If a torch went out the team would lose the race.

In the second type the competition was individual, there was no handing of the torch from one to another, but several torch-bearers started and the first who reached the goal with his torch alight won.

References

Ancient Greek sports